This is a list of mammals that are or were in the past native to the US state of South Carolina.

 Balaenopteridae
 Minke whale (Balaenoptera acutorostrata)
 Sei whale (Balaenoptera borealis)
 Bowhead whale (Balaena mysticetus)
 Fin whale (Balaenoptera physalus)
 Right whale (Eubalaena glacialis)
 Humpback whale (Megaptera novaengliae)

 Bovidae
 American bison (Bison bison) extirpated

 Canidae
 Coyote (Canis latrans)
 Red wolf (Canis rufus) extirpated
 Gray fox (Urocyon cinereoargenteus)
 Red fox (Vulpes vulpes)

 Cervidae
 Elk (Cervus canadensis) vagrant
 Eastern elk (C. c. canadensis) 
 Rocky Mountain elk (C. c. nelsoni) vagrant
 White-tailed deer (Odocoileus virginianus)

 Dasypodidae
 Nine-banded armadillo (Dasypus novemcinctus)

 Delphinidae
 Saddleback dolphin (Delphinus delphis)
 Short-finned pilot whale (Globicephala macrohyncha)
 Atlantic pilot whale (Globicephala melaena)
 Grampus (Grampus griseus)
 Dense-beaked whale (Mesoplodon densirostris)
 Antillean beaked whale (Mesoplodon europaeus)
 True's beaked whale (Mesoplodon mirus)
 False killer whale (Pseudorca crassidens)
 Pantropical spotted dolphin (Stenella attenuata)
 Striped dolphin (Stenella coeruleoalba)
 Atlantic spotted dolphin (Stenella frontails)
 Spinner dolphin (Stenella longirostris)
 Rough-toothed dolphin (Steno bredanensis)
 Common bottlenose dolphin (Tursiops truncatus)

 Didelphimorphia
 Virginia opossum (Didelphis virginiana)

 Felidae
 Bobcat (Lynx rufus)
 Cougar (Puma concolor) extirpated
Eastern cougar, (P. c. couguar) 

 Leporidae
 Swamp rabbit (Sylvilagus aquaticus)
 Eastern cottontail (Sylvilagus floridanus)
 Marsh rabbit (Sylvilagus palustris)
 Snowshoe hare (Lepus americanus) extirpated

 Mephitidae
 Striped skunk (Mephitis mephitis)
 Spotted skunk (Spilogale putorius)

 Molossidae
 Brazilian free-tailed bat (Tadarida brasiliensis)

 Muridae
 House mouse (Mus musculus) introduced
 Meadow vole (Microtus pennsylvanicus)
 Pine vole (Microtus pinetorum)
 Southern red-backed vole (Myodes gapperi)
 Eastern woodrat (Neotoma floridana)
 Golden mouse (Ochrotomys nuttalli)
 Muskrat (Ondatra zibethiscus)
 Marsh rice rat (Oryzomys palustris)
 Cotton mouse (Peromyscus gossypinus)
 White-footed mouse (Peromyscus leucopus)
 Deer mouse (Peromyscus  maniculatus)
 Oldfield mouse (Peromyscus polionotus)
 Black rat (Rattus rattus) introduced
 Norway rat (Rattus norvegicus) introduced
 Eastern harvest mouse (Reithrodontomys humulis)
 Hispid cotton rat (Sigmodon hispidus)

 Mustelidae
 North American river otter (Lontra canadensis)
 Least weasel (Mustela nivalis)
 Long-tailed weasel (Neogale frenata)
 American mink (Neogale vison)

 Phocidae
 Harbor seal (Phoca vitulina)

 Phocoenidae
 Harbor porpoise (Phocoena phocoena)

' Kogiidae
 Pygmy sperm whale (Kogia breviceps)
 Dwarf sperm whale (Kogia simus)

 Physeteridae
 Sperm whale (Physeter macrocephalus)

 Procyonidae
 Raccoon (Procyon lotor)

 Sciuridae
 Southern flying squirrel (Glaucomys volans)
 Groundhog (Marmota monax)
 Gray squirrel (Sciurus carolinensis)
 Fox squirrel (Sciurus niger)
 Eastern chipmunk (Tamias striatus)
 American red squirrel (Tamiasciurus hudsonicus)

 Soricidae
 Northern short-tailed shrew (Blarina brevicauda)
 Southern short-tailed shrew (Blarina carolinensis)
 Least shrew (Cryptotis parva)
 Masked shrew (Sorex cinereus)
 Smoky shrew (Sorex fumeus)
 American pygmy shrew (Sorex hoyi)
 Southeastern shrew (Sorex longirostris)

 Suidae
 Wild boar (Sus scrofa) introduced

 Talpidae
 Star-nosed mole (Condylura cristata)
 Hairy-tailed mole (Parascalops breweri)
 Eastern mole (Scalopus aquaticus)

 Trichechidae
 West Indian manatee (Trichechus manatus)

 Ursidae
 Black bear (Ursus americanus)

 Vespertilionidae
 Big brown bat (Eptesicus fuscus)
 Silver-haired bat (Lasionycteris noctivagans)
 Eastern red bat (Lasiurus borealis)
 Hoary bat (Lasiurus cinereus)
 Northern yellow bat (Lasiurus intermedius)
 Seminole bat (Lasiurus seminolus)
 Southeastern myotis (Myotis austroriparius)
 Eastern small-footed bat (Myotis leibii)
 Little brown bat (Myotis lucifugus)
 Northern long-eared bat (Myotis septentrionalis)
 Indiana bat (Myotis sodalis)
 Evening bat (Nycticeius humeralis)
 Tricolored bat (Perimyotis subflavus)
 Eastern pipistrelle (Pipistrellus subflavus)
 Rafinesque's big-eared bat (Plecotus rafinesqueii)

 Zapodidae
 Woodland jumping mouse (Napaeozapus insignis)
 Meadow jumping mouse (Zapus hudsonius)

 Ziphiidae
 Goosebeaked whale (Ziphius carvirostris)

References

Mammals
South Carolina